Pender Harbour (foaled 2008 in Ontario) was a Canadian National Champion Thoroughbred racehorse that, under jockey Luis Contreras, won two legs of the Canadian Triple Crown series in 2011 and was voted Canadian Three-Year-Old Champion Colt.

Racing career
Named for Pender Harbour, British Columbia, an unincorporated community within the Sunshine Coast Regional District, he raced for six years for his owners, winning eight other stakes races. The durable Pender Harbour competed for the last time on November 29, 2015, finishing second to Melmich in the mile and three-quarter Valedictory Stakes run in track record time. A gelding, after retirement he became a riding horse in Western Canada for his Alberta owners.

References

2008 racehorse births
Thoroughbred racehorses
Racehorses bred in Ontario
Racehorses trained in Canada
Canadian Champion racehorses
Sovereign Award winners